Bernard "Swiftkick" Robinson (born August 23, 1966 in Gaffney, South Carolina) is a former three-time world kickboxing champion. His record is 68-8 (32 KOs). Robinson is also the Guinness world record holder for the Punch-Bag Marathon with a time of 37 hours and 30 minutes on September 1, 2008.

He also competed in 46 professional boxing matches. 

He currently resides in Hendersonville, Tennessee.

References 
Showdown at Southpointe
Pursuing records is a big kick for Southpointe trainer
Punch-Bag Marathon Highlights
Kickboxing Highlights

1966 births
Living people
People from Gaffney, South Carolina
American male kickboxers
Kickboxers from South Carolina
Welterweight kickboxers